Fall from Grace is an American alternative rock band formed in 2004 in Seattle, Washington. The band is best known for winning Fuse TV's reality show Bodog Music Battle of the Bands and winning a one million dollar recording contract with Bodog Music. Fall from Grace beat out over 7,000 bands, ten of which they toured with for the prize. Those bands included new Bodog artists Boston's Fear Nuttin' Band, Miami's Big Bang Radio, Dallas's Ashmore, Houston's Subversa, Atlanta's The Mood, Minneapolis's Leroy Smokes, Los Angeles's Blaxmyth, Phoenix's Idle Red, San Francisco's Strifer, and Philadelphia's Burn Down All Stars.

The band released their first major label album, Sifting Through the Wreckage, in 2008, and toured with Alesana to support the album. The album includes the singles "Pictures on the Wall" and "Last Straw".

Fall from Grace recently reunited to self-release a new album and tour. The band now includes brothers Cotton and Ty McDonald from another popular local band, The Jet City Fix and Jesse Smith, a local Seattle drummer.

Discography 
 Rise from the Ashes (2004, self-release)
 Covered in Scars (2006, self-release)
 Sifting Through the Wreckage (November 4, 2008, Bodog Music/Bunkrock Music)
 The Romance Years (January 24, 2012 Road 2 Hell Rekkids)

Singles 
"Covered in Scars" (from Covered in Scars)
"Burned" (from Sifting Through the Wreckage)
"Hated Youth" (from Sifting Through the Wreckage)
"King of Lies" (from Sifting Through the Wreckage)
"Pictures on the Wall" (from Sifting Through the Wreckage)
"18 and Out" (from The Romance Years)

Band members 
 Tryg Sebastian Littlefield – lead vocals, rhythm guitar
 Brian Olson – lead guitar, backing vocals
 Ty McDonald – guitars
 Justin "Cotton" McDonald – bass, backing vocals
 Jesse Smith – drums, vocals

Former members
 Kenny Bates – drums
 Ken Olson – bass, backing vocals

External links 
 Official website
 MySpace
 Album art and portraits of the band
 Burning Stars interview with Tryg
 Interview with Tryg Littlefield & Fall from Grace song lyrics

Musical groups from Seattle
Reality show winners
Participants in American reality television series
Punk rock groups from Washington (state)
Musical groups established in 2004
Alternative rock groups from Washington (state)